Saint-Cyr (Vivaro-Alpine: Sant Circ) is a commune in the Ardèche department in southern France.

See also
Communes of the Ardèche department

References

External links

 Saint-Cyr website

Communes of Ardèche
Ardèche communes articles needing translation from French Wikipedia